The Women's domestic rugby union leagues in Scotland are organised in a similar vein to the men's domestic leagues: on a national basis for the top leagues and regional leagues below feeding into those leagues.

The top two Women's national leagues are the Premiership and National Division 1. The following leagues are split into regions.

History

Women's rugby union in Scotland was amalgamated with the main governing body, Scottish Rugby Union in 2009 after a unanimous vote at their AGM

Sponsorship

The league is currently sponsored by the drinks firm Tennents. Prior to Tennents sponsorship, the telecommunications firm British Telecom were sponsors.

Current season

These are the teams competing for the championship in each league for the 2021-22 season. 2XVs and 3XVs are not listed.

Scottish Womens Premiership

 Heriot Blues Women
 Watsonians
 Corstorphine
 Stirling County
 Cartha Queens Park
 Hillhead Jordanhill

Womens National Division One

 West of Scotland
 Kelso
 Howe of Fife
 Ayr
 Garioch
 Broughton
 Annan
 Stewartry

Womens West Regional League

 Oban Lorne
 Greenock Wanderers
 Wigtownshire
 Hamilton
 Bishopton
 Glasgow University
 Ardrossan Academicals
 Biggar

Womens Midlands and East Regional League

 Grangemouth
 Liberton
 Strathmore
 Dundee Valkyries
 Dunfermline
 Kirkcaldy
 Lismore
 Livingston
 RDVC

Previous seasons

There was a restructuring of the women's leagues in 2018.

National Competitions - Season 2016/17

2016–17 BT Women's Premier League

Premier League consists of 8 teams as listed on the Scottish Rugby Union website (in alphabetical order):

Ayr Women (part of Ayr RFC)
Cartha Queens Park Women (part of Cartha Queens Park RFC) 
Hillhead/Jordanhill Women (part of Hillhead Jordanhill RFC)
Melrose Women (part of Melrose RFC)
Murrayfield Wanderers FC Women (part of Murrayfield Wanderers RFC)
RHC Cougars Women (part of Royal High Corstorphine RFC
Stewartry Women
Stirling County Women (part of Stirling County RFC)

BT Women's National League Division 1 16-17

National 1 consists of 7 teams (in alphabetical order):

Aberdeenshire Quines (part of Aberdeenshire RFC)
Broughton Women
Garioch Women
Glasgow University Women
Greenock Women
Kirkcaldy Women
Watsonians Ladies

BT Women's National League Division 2 16-17

National 2 consists of 7 teams (in alphabetical order):

Annan Women
Grangemouth Stagettes
Greenock Wanderers Women
Howe of Fife Women
Lismore Women
Oban Lorne Women
Royal Dick Vet College Women

BT Women's North 16-17

National 2 consists of 4 teams (in alphabetical order):

Banff
Inverness
Orkney
Shetland

National Development League

Helensburgh
Kelso
Livingston
Liberton

National Competitions - Season 2015/16

2015–16 BT Women's Premier League

Premier League consisted of 6 teams as listed on the Scottish Rugby Union website (in alphabetical order):

Cartha Queens Park Women (part of Cartha Queens Park RFC) 
Hillhead/Jordanhill Women (part of Hillhead Jordanhill RFC)
Melrose Women (part of Melrose RFC)
Murrayfield Wanderers FC Women (part of Murrayfield Wanderers RFC)
RHC Cougars Women (part of Royal High Corstorphine RFC
Stirling County Women (part of Stirling County RFC)

BT Women's National League Division 1 15-16

National 1 consisted of 8 teams (in alphabetical order):

Aberdeenshire Quines (part of Aberdeenshire RFC)
Ayr Women(part of Ayr RFC)
Broughton Women
Glasgow University Women
Kirkcaldy Women
Oban Lorne Women
Stewartry Women
Watsonians Ladies

BT Women's National League Division 2 15-16

National 2 consisted of 8 teams (in alphabetical order):

Annan Women
Garioch Women
Grangemouth
Greenock Wanderers Women
Howe of Fife Women
Lismore Women
Morgan Women
Royal Dick Vet College Women

National Development League

Banff
Helensburgh
Inverness
Kelso
Strathclyde Uni

References